Fahrenheit is a perfume for men produced by Parfums Christian Dior. The fragrance was introduced in 1988. It was created by the perfumers Maurice Roger and Jean-Louis Sieuzac.

References

External links
 Fahrenheit at Basenotes
 Dior Fahrenheit at herren-und-damen

Dior
Perfumes
Products introduced in 1988